Jack Reilly (born May 22, 1946) is a former American football coach. He served as an offensive coordinator in the National Football League (NFL) with the St. Louis Rams and the Dallas Cowboys. Reilly's background is in the Don Coryell–Ernie Zampese-style West Coast offense.

References

1946 births
Living people
American football quarterbacks
Dallas Cowboys coaches
El Camino Warriors football coaches
Long Beach State 49ers football players
Los Angeles Raiders coaches
National Football League offensive coordinators
New England Patriots coaches
San Diego Chargers coaches
Santa Monica Corsairs football players
St. Louis Rams coaches
Utah Utes football coaches
Washington State Cougars football players
Junior college football coaches in the United States
People from Culver City, California
Coaches of American football from California
Players of American football from Boston
Players of American football from California